The American Premiere League (APL) is a Twenty20 cricket league based in the United States. The first league was scheduled to take place between October 6 and October 24, 2009, which was later postponed. The management revamped the brand in 2020 and went through the official launch during the spring of 2021. The teams were named after cricket spectators spread across the United States i.e. Indians, Paks, Windies, Bengalees, Aussies, English, and Americans.

History
In 2009 APL announced an imminent three-year deal with minor league club the Staten Island Yankees who own the venue. The league had planned to play twice a year at baseball's Richmond County Bank Ballpark. Besides renowned staff and players, six teams were expected to take part in the first event: Premium Pakistan, Premium India, Premium Bengal, Premium West Indies, Premium World and Premium America, but the event did not materialise.

In 2009 the ICC announced support for the creation of a Twenty20 cricket competition in the US to compete against the APL, and in December 2010 the board of the United States of America Cricket Association that it had signed a $10 million deal with New Zealand Cricket and other investors as stakeholders, creating a new body called Cricket Holdings America to manage all commercial rights for cricket in USA, including Twenty20 rights, in perpetuity.

No American Premiere League matches were played in 2010. In 2011 no further matches were announced and the venture appeared defunct.

Controversy 
The American Premiere League established contact with the USA Cricket Association but had not submitted a formal approval. In 2009 the International Cricket Council (ICC) halt national players to participate until further release instructions and approval.

Revamped
American Premiere League's Inaugural season was initially scheduled for Spring of 2020, but was postponed due to the COVID-19 pandemic. On February 15, 2021, the CEO of APL, Jay Mir, signed an exclusive multi-year contract with the Minor League Baseball team, The Jersey Jackals. This contract was to host the American Premiere League at the Yogi Berra Stadium in Little Falls, New Jersey. On March 15, 2021, the American Premiere League was officially launched at a dinner party in Montclair, New Jersey. Following the announcement, the American Premiere League sold all seven teams to various entrepreneurs.

Tournament Format
Each team faces every other team once in the round games. The top four teams, with the most points, advance to the semifinals. The two winners will face each other off in the finals. The inaugural season of the American Premiere League had total prizes worth $200,000.

Seasons 
On September 13, 2021, American Premiere League's Inaugural Tournament kicked off with an opening ceremony. The tournament started on Sept 20th with three back-to-back matches every day.

Teams

See also 
 History of United States cricket
 Cricket in the United States
 Impact of the COVID-19 pandemic on cricket

References

Twenty20 cricket leagues
Cricket leagues in the United States
2009 establishments in the United States